The 2022 Copa Paraguay was the fourth edition of the Copa Paraguay, Paraguay's domestic football cup competition organized by the Paraguayan Football Association (APF). The competition began on 10 May and ended on 10 November 2022, with the winners qualifying for the 2023 Copa Sudamericana as well as the 2022 Supercopa Paraguay against the Primera División champions with better record in the aggregate table.

Sportivo Ameliano won their first Copa Paraguay title, beating Nacional on penalty kicks after a 1–1 draw in regular time in the final. Olimpia were the defending champions, but were defeated by Libertad in the round of 16.

Format
On 22 April 2022, the APF confirmed the expansion of the tournament to 74 teams with the inclusion of three preliminary rounds involving clubs from the Football Union of the Interior (UFI), Primera C, Primera B, División Intermedia and Primera División.

For the first stage, the 17 UFI teams were paired according to their geographical location into seven single-legged ties and a triangular group with the remaining three teams, with the winners of the seven ties and the top two teams of the triangular advancing to the next round. The 17 Primera B clubs were drawn in a similar arrangement to the UFI zone except that the ties were decided by a draw, while the 12 Primera C clubs were drawn into six single-legged ties. Nine Primera B teams, six Primera C ones, and nine UFI ones advanced to the next round, where they were joined by the 16 División Intermedia clubs. The 40 clubs competing in the second stage were drawn into 20 single-legged ties, with the winners advancing to the third stage where they were drawn against the 12 Primera División clubs. The 16 third stage winners advanced to the round of 16. Ties in all subsequent rounds were played on a single-legged basis, with a penalty shootout deciding the winner in case of a draw.

Teams
The 2022 edition had a total of 74 participating teams:

Primera División

 12 de Octubre (I)
 Cerro Porteño
 General Caballero (JLM)
 Guaireña
 Guaraní
 Libertad
 Nacional
 Olimpia
 Resistencia
 Sol de América
 Sportivo Ameliano
 Tacuary

División Intermedia

2 de Mayo
3 de Febrero (CDE)
Atlético Colegiales
Atyrá
Deportivo Santaní
Fernando de la Mora
Guaraní (T)
Independiente (CG)
Martín Ledesma
Pastoreo
River Plate
Rubio Ñu
San Lorenzo
Sportivo Iteño
Sportivo Luqueño
Sportivo Trinidense

Primera B

3 de Febrero (RB)
3 de Noviembre
24 de Setiembre (VP)
29 de Setiembre
Atlántida
Cristóbal Colón (JAS)
Cristóbal Colón (Ñ)
Deportivo Capiatá
Deportivo Recoleta
Fulgencio Yegros 
General Caballero (ZC)
General Díaz
Olimpia (Itá)
Presidente Hayes
Silvio Pettirossi
Sportivo Limpeño
Tembetary

Primera C

1° de Marzo (FDM)
12 de Octubre (SD)
Atlético Juventud
Benjamín Aceval
Deportivo Pinozá
General Caballero (CG)
Humaitá
Oriental
Pilcomayo
Sport Colombia
Sport Colonial
Valois Rivarola

UFI
The champions from each of the 17 departments of Paraguay qualified for the competition:

 Nacional (Yby Yaú) (Concepción)
 Guaraní Unido (San Pedro)
 Porvenir (Cordillera)
 Capitán Samudio (Guairá)
 Atletico Forestal (Caaguazú)
 Coronel Martínez (Caazapá)
 Deportivo Juventud (Itapúa)
 15 de Agosto (S) (Misiones)
 Sol de Mayo (Paraguarí)
 Obreros Unidos (Alto Paraná)
 8 de Setiembre (Central)
 1° de Marzo FBC (Ñeembucú)
 Deportivo Obrero (Amambay)
 Sport Primavera (Canindeyú)
 15 de Agosto (BA) (Presidente Hayes)
 1 de Mayo (Boquerón)
 Deportivo Alto Paraguay (Alto Paraguay)

First stage
The draw for the first stage was held on 22 April 2022 and matches were played from 10 May to 17 June 2022.

Primera B

Triangular (Zone 1)

Knockout ties (Zones 2–8)

Primera C

UFI

Knockout ties (Zones 1, 3–8)

Triangular (Zone 2)

Second stage
The draw for the second stage was held on 20 June 2022. Matches in this round were played from 28 June to 21 July 2022.

Third stage
The draw for the third stage and subsequent rounds was held on 15 July 2022. Matches in this round were played from 26 July to 11 August 2022.

Bracket

Round of 16
The schedule for the round of 16 was announced by the APF on 25 August 2022. Matches in this round were played from 6 to 8 September 2022.

Quarter-finals
The schedule for the quarter-finals was announced by the APF on 21 September 2022. Matches in this round were played on 27 and 28 September 2022.

Semi-finals

Final
On 14 October 2022, the APF confirmed that the final would be played in Encarnación on 4 November 2022, as the opening event of the newly built Estadio Villa Alegre.

Third place play-off

See also
2022 Paraguayan Primera División season
2022 Paraguayan División Intermedia

References

External links
Copa Paraguay on the official website of the Paraguayan Football Association 

Copa Paraguay
Copa